This is a list of ambassadors from Belgium to the United Kingdom, who head the Embassy of Belgium, London. Formally, they are the Ambassador of His Majesty the King of the Belgians to the Court of St. James's.

Ambassador Extraordinary and Plenipotentiary 

 1831-1867: Sylvain Van de Weyer; plenip. minister. 
 1904-1917: Count Charles Maximilien de Lalaing
 1927-1946: Baron Emile de Cartier de Marchienne
 1958-1962/ Réné van Meerbeke
 1994–1997: Jonkheer Prosper Thuysbaert
 1997–2002: Lode Willems
 2002–2006: Baron Thierry de Gruben
 2006–2010: Jean-Michel Veranneman de Watervliet
 2010–2014: Johan C. Verbeke
 2014–2017: Guy Trouveroy
 2017–: Rudolf Huygelen
2020–: Bruno van der Pluijm

References

External links 
 Website of the Belgian Embassy to the United Kingdom

United Kingdom
Belgium